Tumxuk (Tumushuke) Tangwangcheng Airport  is an airport serving the city of Tumxuk (Tumushuke) in Xinjiang Uyghur Autonomous Region of northwestern China.

History 
The airport received approval from the State Council of China and the Central Military Commission in January 2014. Construction officially began on 12 March 2016, with a total investment of 631 million yuan, and the airport was opened on 26 December 2018 with an inaugural China Southern Airlines flight from Ürümqi. It is the second airport built and managed by the Xinjiang Production and Construction Corps, and the 21st civil airport in Xinjiang.

Facilities 

Airlines and destinations

See also
List of airports in China
List of the busiest airports in China

References

Airports in Xinjiang
Airports established in 2018
2018 establishments in China